Love Me (styled: LOVE ME) is an Australian drama series and the first original production of streaming service Binge. Set in Melbourne, Victoria, Love Me is a story about love, loss and relationship complexity for the father, daughter and son of a contemporary, middle-class Australian family.  Triggered by the death of the disabled mother, cared for by the father at home for some years, the three stumble in their lives, eventually finding themselves and each other.

The season one, six-part series is directed by Emma Freeman with lead writer Alison Bell, and writers Leon Ford, Adele Vuko and Blake Ayshford. Season two was announced in June 2022 and is scheduled to premierre on 6 April 2023.

The ensemble cast includes Hugo Weaving, Bojana Novakovic, William Lodder and Sarah Peirse along with Bob Morley, Heather Mitchell, Celia Pacquola, Mitzi Ruhlmann and Shalom Brune-Franklin.

Love Me is produced by Angie Fielder and Polly Staniford of Aquarius Films and Executive Produced by Michael Brooks and Hamish Lewis (Warner Bros.). Executive Producers for the FOXTEL Group are Brian Walsh, Alison Hurbert-Burns and Lana Greenhalgh.

Based on the acclaimed Swedish series, Älska mig, created by Josephine Bornebusch.

Cast
 Bojana Novakovic as Clara Mathieson  
 Hugo Weaving as Glen Mathieson 
 William Lodder as Aaron Mathieson
 Bob Morley as Peter K
 Heather Mitchell as Anita
 Sarah Peirse as Christine Mathieson
 Mitzi Ruhlmann as Jesse
 Shalom Brune-Franklin as Ella
 Celia Pacquola as Sacha
John Augustine Sharp as Max

Episodes

Production

Love Me is a Warner Bros. International Television Production Australia production in association with Aquarius Films for the FOXTEL Group. Major production investment from Screen Australia and financed with support from Film Victoria through production investment and the Regional Location Assistance Fund. The series will be produced by Angie Fielder and Polly Staniford (Aquarius Films) and Executive Produced by Michael Brooks and Hamish Lewis (Warner Bros.) Brian Walsh, Alison Hurbert-Burns and Lana Greenhalgh (FOXTEL Group).

On the eve of  the Australian TV Week 2022 Logie Awards, where Love Me received seven nominations, Binge announced a second season.

Awards 
2022 Australian TV Week Logie Awards nominations:  Most Outstanding Actor, Most Outstanding Drama Program, Most Outstanding Drama Series, Most Outstanding Supporting Actress, Grammy Kennedy Most Popular New Talent,  Most Popular Actress, Most Popular Actor.

References

External links
 

2021 Australian television series debuts
2020s Australian drama television series
English-language television shows
Television series by Warner Bros. Television Studios